Santa Rosalía is a city and municipal seat of Mulegé Municipality, in Baja California Sur, situated along the Gulf of California. Located on the east coast of the Baja Peninsula, the town had a population of 14,160 inhabitants in 2015. The city was founded as a company town by the French Compagnie du Boleo in 1884, which established the local copper mines. Today the city is a popular tourist destination.

History

Santa Rosalía boasts French influence, particularly in its architecture. The French Compagnie du Boleo founded the town in 1884 and exploited copper mines there until they closed in 1954. They built houses and installed the metallic Iglesia de Santa Bárbara.

Unlike many other mining sites, the industrial facilities which are located in the very middle of the town, were never dismantled. Of particular interest are the reverberatory furnace and the metallurgical converter, although they are currently not accessible by the public due to safety concerns.  Old locomotives, mining equipment and machinery are visible everywhere.  The main mining company offices (La dirección) have been converted into an industrial museum.

El Boleo copper mines

The Boleo Mine is an unusual sediment-hosted copper-cobalt-zinc-manganese ore deposit. Seven large manto ore deposits have been identified.

El Boleo was mined by Compagnie du Boleo, a French company, from 1885 until 1954. To prevent the economic collapse of Santa Rosalia and surrounding communities, a Mexican state-owned company (CMSRSA) assumed control and reopened the works using basically the same (rather archaic) equipment and process used by the French. The government funded operation was never profitable, and the mine was finally closed in the 1980s, when lower-grade ore and old technology made continued operation impractical.

Modern mining efforts
Baja Mining, a Canadian firm, began intermittent exploration of the El Boleo mine and subsequently undertook an effort to reopen El Boleo. Baja Mining estimated that the property contains a resource of 534 million tons of ore, containing 0.59% Cu, 0.051% Co, and 0.63% Zn. Baja also hoped to produce byproduct manganese. Baja Mining, in partnership with a Korean Consortium began developing the $1.6 Billion project in 2010. 

In 2012 however, construction cost overruns reported by Baja Mining threatened to halt or delay construction of the project. Majority ownership interest and control of the project was transferred to the Korean consortium, in return for funding the reported cost overruns. On January 26, 2015 Minera y Metalurgica del Boleo obtained its first copper production from the process of crushing, leaching, extracting and electrowinning in its mine-metallurgic project "El Boleo".

Geography

Santa Rosalía is a port city, and a regular ferry connects with Guaymas, Sonora, on the other side of the Gulf of California.   At the Palo Verde Airport daily flights are available from Guaymas and twice a week from Hermosillo, Sonora.  It is located along Mexican Federal Highway 1.

Climate
Due to its location in the warm Gulf waters, which are considerably warmer than Pacific waters in the winter, the town is the northernmost (and thus closest to the US border) year-round warm locale on the main peninsular highway.  Nevertheless, it's not much of a tourist town and sees few snowbirds.

Demographics 
The 2015 census showed a population of 14,160 persons. 

The population was 10190 in 1990.

See also 
 Volcanoes of east-central Baja California
 Porfirio Díaz

References

External links 
 2010 census tables: INEGI: Instituto Nacional de Estadística, Geografia e Informática

Populated places in Baja California Sur
Mining communities in Mexico
Mulegé Municipality
Populated coastal places in Mexico
Port cities and towns on the Mexican Pacific coast
Municipality seats in Baja California Sur